The Irlanda Fault is a dextral strike-slip fault in the department of Cauca in south-central Colombia. A small portion of the fault runs through Huila. The fault is active and associated with the deadly 1994 Páez River earthquake.

Etymology 
The fault is named after vereda Irlanda of Popayán, Cauca.

Description 
The Irlanda Fault extends through the axis of the Central Ranges, east of the city of Popayán. It cuts igneous and metamorphic rocks that are capped with Quaternary volcanic ash and lapilli. The Irlanda Fault consists of two en-echelon strands. The fault trace has medium geomorphic expression and, although somewhat obscure, there are offset spurs, degraded fault scarps, broad fault valleys, saddles, aligned drainage, and deflected streams. The fault runs east of the Puracé volcano and south of the Nevado del Huila.

Activity 

The fault has been estimated as being responsible for the 1994 Páez River earthquake, occurring on June 6, 1994. The earthquake destroyed the town of Páez and produced approximately 1100 fatalities. The Colombian Red Cross presented a figure of 28,000 people affected by the earthquake and the resulting landslides, mudflows, avalanches and isolation due to lacking communication.

See also 

 List of earthquakes in Colombia
 Bucaramanga-Santa Marta Fault
 Romeral Fault System

References

Bibliography

Maps

Further reading 
 

Seismic faults of Colombia
Strike-slip faults
Active faults
Faults
Faults
Earthquakes in Colombia